Ilya Andreyevich Belous (born 1 January 1995) is a Russian football player. He plays as a forward for Dynamo Bryansk.

Club career
He made his professional debut in the Russian Professional Football League for FC Lokomotiv-2 Moscow on 19 April 2014 in a game against FC Strogino Moscow.

He played for the main squad of FC Volga Nizhny Novgorod in the Russian Cup on 30 October 2013 in a game against FC SKA-Energiya Khabarovsk.

He made his Russian Football National League debut for FC Khimki on 17 July 2018 in a game against FC Luch Vladivostok.

References

External links
 
 

1995 births
Living people
People from Novosibirsk Oblast
Sportspeople from Novosibirsk Oblast
Russian footballers
Russia youth international footballers
Association football forwards
PFC CSKA Moscow players
FC Krasnodar players
FC Krasnodar-2 players
FC Lokomotiv Moscow players
FC Volga Nizhny Novgorod players
FC Milsami Orhei players
FC Khimki players
FC Chayka Peschanokopskoye players
FC Volgar Astrakhan players
FC Shinnik Yaroslavl players
FC Belshina Bobruisk players
FC Dynamo Bryansk players
Russian First League players
Russian Second League players
Moldovan Super Liga players
Russian expatriate footballers
Expatriate footballers in Moldova
Expatriate footballers in Belarus